Pristimantis gladiator (common name: Papallacta Valley robber frog) is a species of frog in the family Strabomantidae.
It is found on the Amazonian slopes of the Andes in Ecuador (Napo Province, Imbabura Province) and southern Colombia (Putumayo Department). Its elevational range is  asl.

Description
Pristimantis gladiator has a brown to orange-brown dorsum with dark brown markings, and a black groin with orange to red spots. Adult males measure  in snout–vent length; adult females are unknown.

Habitat and conservation
Its natural habitats are páramo grassland, cloud forest, and clearings. They are hiding by day under rocks and logs. It is threatened by habitat loss.

References

gladiator
Amphibians of the Andes
Amphibians of Colombia
Amphibians of Ecuador
Páramo fauna
Amphibians described in 1976
Taxonomy articles created by Polbot